Ernest Leslie Ransome (1844–1917) was an English-born engineer, architect, and early innovator in reinforced concrete building techniques.  Ransome devised the most sophisticated concrete structures in the United States at the time.

Ernest was the son of Frederick Ransome, who had patented a process for producing artificial stone in 1844.  Ernest was apprenticed to his father's factory in Ipswich.  By the 1870s Ernest had moved to the USA and was the superintendent of the Pacific Stone Company in San Francisco.  In 1884 after experimenting with reinforced concrete sidewalks, he patented a system of ferro-concrete with the iron rods twisted to improve the bond, then developed a patented Ransome system for practical reinforced concrete construction.  In 1886 Ransome built two small underpass bridges in the Golden Gate Park in San Francisco which survive today, and which are the first reinforced concrete bridges in North America, and among the first three or four in the world.

After a long string of accomplishments Ransome continued to meet with skepticism and resistance.  His techniques were vindicated when his 1897 Pacific Coast Borax Refinery in Bayonne, NJ in 1902 went through a massive building fire hot enough to melt brass; the concrete frame was only slightly damaged and thereby concrete framed industrial architecture was shown to have a key superiority over competing steel and iron framed structures.  

  

Likewise Ransome's two experimental buildings at Stanford survived the 1906 San Francisco earthquake essentially without damage while the university's newer, conventional brick structures literally crumbled around them.  The published analysis of these two buildings by fellow engineer John B. Leonard did much to advance the safety of buildings in post-1906 San Francisco and nationwide.  

In his later career Ransome focused on mixing equipment, formwork, and integrated building systems.  In 1912 Ransome and Alexis Saurbrey co-authored Reinforced Concrete Buildings.  One of Ransome's sons was the notable American geologist Frederick Leslie Ransome (1868-1935).

Work 
 Arctic Oil Works, San Francisco, 1884, the "first reinforced concrete building (of its kind) in the United States".
 Pacific Coast Borax Refinery, Alameda, California, 1889 
 Alvord Lake Bridge, Golden Gate Park, San Francisco, 1889, the first reinforced concrete bridge built in the United States 
 Torpedo Assembly Building, eastern end of Yerba Buena Island, San Francisco, 1891
 Berkeley Apartments (Buffalo, New York), Buffalo, New York, 1894–1897
 Pacific Coast Borax Refinery - first phase, Bayonne, New Jersey, 1897
 Pacific Coast Borax Refinery - second phase, Bayonne, New Jersey, 1903
 Japanese Bridge at Francis Marion Smith's estate Presdeleau, still visible at 24 Merkel Lane Shelter Island, New York
 four city reservoirs at Mount Tabor and Washington Park, Portland, Oregon, 1894–1911
 Roble Hall (women's dormitory) at Stanford University, 1891, renamed Sequoia Hall in 1917 (razed)
 The Leland Stanford Junior Museum of Art (now the Iris & B. Gerald Cantor Center for Visual Arts), at Stanford University, 1894
 United Shoe factory buildings, Beverly, Massachusetts, 1902
 Ingalls Building, Cincinnati, Ohio, 1903

Sources 

 online biography

1852 births
1917 deaths
American engineers
Concrete pioneers
Architecture in the San Francisco Bay Area